JDS Isuzu (DE-211) is the lead ship of the s of the Japan Maritime Self-Defense Force (JMSDF).

Development and design 
This class was the first JMSDF surface combatant adopted shelter-deck design. Propulsion systems varied in each vessel because the JMSDF tried to find the best method in propulsion systems for future destroyer escorts (DEs).

The main air-search radar was an OPS-2, a Japanese variant of the American AN/SPS-12.

Construction and career
Isuzu was laid down on 16 April 1960 at Mitsui Engineering and Shipbuilding, Tamano and launched on 17 January 1961.

Modernization work was carried out from 15 October 1974 to 5 February 1975, and the Mk.108 anti-submarine rocket launcher and Mk.2 short torpedo launcher were removed, and the Type 71 Bofors rocket launcher and Type 68 triple short torpedo launcher were equipped. 

On 8 April 1988, the type was changed to a special service ship, the ship registration number was changed to ASU-7015, and it was transferred to the Maizuru District Force as a ship under direct control. The long torpedo launcher was removed during the modernization work to the special service ship. She was stricken on 25 March 1995.

References

1961 ships
Ships built by Mitsui Engineering and Shipbuilding
Isuzu-class destroyer escorts